Hideichi Yoshioka (born 10 September 1914) was a Japanese wrestler. He competed in the men's Greco-Roman featherweight at the 1936 Summer Olympics.

References

External links
 

1914 births
Japanese male sport wrestlers
Olympic wrestlers of Japan
Wrestlers at the 1936 Summer Olympics
Place of birth missing
20th-century Japanese people